Burtola Assembly constituency was a Legislative Assembly constituency of Kolkata district in the Indian state of West Bengal.

Overview
As a consequence of the orders of the Delimitation Commission, Burtola Assembly constituency ceases to exist from 2011.
 
It was part of Calcutta North East (Lok Sabha constituency).

Members of Legislative Assembly

Results

1977-2006
Sadhan Pande representing Trinamool Congress won the 158 Burtolla assembly seat defeating Kalyan Mukherjee of RSP  in 2006 and 2001. Earlier, Sadhan Pande, representing Congress defeated Parimal Routh of RSP in 1996 and 1991, and Sunil Sengupta of RSP in 1987.Ajit Kumar Panja of Congress defeated Nikhil Das of RSP in 1982. Nikhil Das of RSP defeated Ajit Kumar Panja of Congress in 1977.

1951-1972
Ajit Kumar Panja won in 1972 and 1971 defeating Lakshmi Kanta Roy of CPI(M) in both years. Nikhil Das of RSP won in 1969 defeating Ajit Kumar Panja of Congress and in 1967 defeating S.C.R. Chaudhuri of Congress. Amarendra Nath Basu of CPI won the Burtolla South in 1962 defeating Suhrid Rudra of Congress. In 1957, Burtolla had two seats. Sudhir Chandra Ray Chaudhuri of PSP won the Burtola North seat defeating Aparesh Bhattacharya of Congress. Amarendra Nath Basu Independent won the Burtola South seat defeating Suhrid Rudra of Congress. In independent India’s first election Nirmal Chandra De of Congress won the Burtola seat defeating Sudhir Roy Chuoudhury of KMPP by 492 votes, Nilamber Chatterjee of Forward Bloc (Marxists) and others.

References

Former assembly constituencies of West Bengal
Politics of Kolkata district